Hart Energy, based in Houston, publishes online newspapers and magazines covering the petroleum industry and provides related research and consulting services.

History
The company was founded in Denver in 1973. Phillips International acquired the company in 1991 and sold it in 2000 for over $100 million. In March 2004, the company was acquired by management and changed its name to Hart Energy Publishing, LP.

On October 2010, Hart Energy acquired Rextag Strategies Mapping & Data Services.

On May 2, 2013, Hart Energy acquired Subsea Engineering News.

References

External links
 
 Rextag - Hart Energy Mapping & Data Services

Companies based in Houston
Petroleum in Texas
Petroleum industry
Publishing companies established in 1973
Publishing companies of the United States